Magdelín Martínez Castillo (born February 10, 1976, in Camagüey, Cuba) is a Cuban-born female triple jumper, competing internationally for Italy.

Biography
She originally represented Cuba. She won the bronze medal at the 1999 Pan American Games. She jumped 14.27 metres in 1998 and 14.40 metres in 2000.

She met future husband, Giuseppe Piccotti, while he was holidaying in the Caribbean. When he fell ill, she was quick to supply him with medicine, and it all went from there. After moving to Italy she wanted to take up jumping again but even though she was jumping personal bests she felt a little closed off from her colleagues, and accepted with good spirits that she would have to become an Italian. She naturalised in July 2001 and competed for Italy at the 2001 World Championships in Edmonton. She finished fourth, having set a personal best of 14.59 metres in the qualification.

The next year she finished sixth at the 2002 European Championships. In 2003, she finished fifth at the 2003 World Indoor Championships before winning the bronze medal at the 2003 World Championships. At the end of the season she finished fifth at the first World Athletics Final. In 2004, she finished fifth at the World Indoor Championships, seventh at the Olympic Games and fifth at the World Athletics Final. She also jumped two career bests: 15.03 in the triple jump in the Rome Golden Gala, and 6.67 in long jump in Rieti. In 2005, she won the silver medal at the European Indoor Championships,  finished eighth at the World Championships and seventh at the World Athletics Final.

2006 was a mediocre year. Her season's best was 14.25 metres, down from 15.03 in 2004 and 14.69 in 2005. She competed at the 2006 European Championships, but did not reach the final. However, she made a small comeback in 2007 to finish seventh at the 2007 World Championships. Her season's best jump was 14.71 metres. The next year she competed at the 2008 Olympic Games without reaching the final.

See also
 Italian all-time top lists - Long jump

References

External links
 

1976 births
Living people
Cuban female triple jumpers
Italian female triple jumpers
Athletes (track and field) at the 2004 Summer Olympics
Athletes (track and field) at the 2008 Summer Olympics
Olympic athletes of Italy
Athletes (track and field) at the 1999 Pan American Games
Pan American Games bronze medalists for Cuba
Pan American Games medalists in athletics (track and field)
Cuban emigrants to Italy
Naturalised citizens of Italy
Sportspeople from Camagüey
World Athletics Championships medalists
World Athletics Championships athletes for Italy
Medalists at the 1999 Pan American Games